The Great Longing is a 1930 German comedy film directed by Steve Sekely in his directorial debut and starring Camilla Horn, Theodor Loos, and Harry Frank. It was shot at the EFA Studios in Berlin. The film's sets were designed by the art directors Hans Sohnle and Otto Erdmann. It was distributed by the German branch of Universal Pictures.

Cast

Bibliography

External links

1930 films
1930 comedy films
Films directed by Steve Sekely
Films of the Weimar Republic
Films scored by Friedrich Hollaender
Films scored by Paul Dessau
German comedy films
1930s German-language films
German black-and-white films
Universal Pictures films
1930 directorial debut films
1930s German films
Films shot at Halensee Studios